Lukashov is a Slavic male surname, its feminine counterpart is Lukashova. Notable people with the surname include:

Denys Lukashov (born 1989), Ukrainian basketball player
Yuriy Lukashov (born 1974), Belarusian football coach and former player

See also
Lukasheva

Slavic-language surnames